Bridgewater High School may refer to several schools throughout the world:

Bridgewater High School (Tasmania) in Bridgewater, Tasmania, Australia
Bridgewater High School (Warrington) in Appleton, Warrington, Cheshire, England
Bridgewater High School (South Dakota) in Bridgewater, South Dakota, United States

See also
East Bridgewater High School in East Bridgewater, Massachusetts, United States
Bridgewater-Raritan High School in Bridgewater, New Jersey, United States
Bridgewater-Raynham Regional High School in Bridgewater, Massachusetts, United States
West Bridgewater Middle-Senior High School in West Bridgewater, Massachusetts, United States